Scott Ehrlich (born July 20, 1965) is an American real estate developer, businessman and filmmaker. He is the principal and a partner of InSite Development, LLC which owns and manages 3500+ apartment units and 320,000 square feet of commercial throughout Southern California. He is best known for revitalization and redevelopment of downtown Lancaster, California.

Early life and education
Ehrlich was born on July 20, 1965, in Hollywood, California, and currently lives in Agoura Hills, California. He earned his bachelor's degree from University of Arizona.

Career

Real estate development
Ehrlich began his real estate career in 1986, specializing in the financing and development of affordable housing projects using Low Income Housing Tax Credits, Tax Exempt Bond Financing, HUD Section 202 Loans, Redevelopment Set Asides Funds, Mello Roos Districts, Community Development Block Grant Funds, Century Freeway Housing Loans, and CRA programs. Since then, Ehrlich has worked with redevelopment agencies, municipalities, and private developers to fund in excess $214 million for affordable housing projects and commercial redevelopment. Ehrlich has been an integral part in creating over 4,000 newly constructed and rehabilitated apartments throughout California.

As a partner of InSite Development, Ehrlich began his Lancaster endeavors by purchasing existing apartment buildings in the Antelope Valley in 1998. From there, InSite Development worked on new construction deals funded by Low Income Housing Tax Credits to build senior housing projects in 2004 and 2005, and partnered with Mental Health America Los Angeles for another project in 2006.  In 2009, Ehrlich had a vision to change the image of Lancaster. Working closely with elected officials and City staff, he made plans for the revitalization of the downtown. The first downtown project was the Arbor Artist Lofts, completed in August 2009. The Lofts won the 2010 AIA HUD Secretary's Housing and Community Design Award. In 2009, Ehrlich developed another project, "BeX Bar & Grill" in Lancaster which has since closed. Since the arbor lofts, Ehrlich and his team have revitalized downtown Lancaster in a relatively short amount of time.

In 2010, Ehrlich began the project of Lancaster Boulevard. It transformed the four-lane, automobile-dominated thoroughfare into a pedestrian-friendly boulevard. The BLVD has won numerous awards, including the 2011 APA Planning Excellence in Implementation Award of Merit, the 2012 National Award for Smart Growth Achievement, the 2012 California Redevelopment Association Award of Excellence, the 2012 California Downtown Association Award, the 2013 International Downtown Association Pinnacle Award and the 2014 San Fernando Valley Business Journal's Commercial Real Estate Awards. 

In 2011, Ehrlich developed The Laemmle BLVD Cinemas, which is only luxury style cinema in the Antelope Valley area. It opened to the public on August 14, 2011. He also helped with the development of The BLVD's Renaissance Center. Ehrlich also developed Kinetic Brewing Company in Lancaster which won two bronze medals at the Great American Beer Festival in 2013, which has since closed.

In 2012, a new eatery, the 1800 Restaurant on The BLVD in Lancaster was established by Ehrlich's InSite Development with assistance from the City's Commercial Property Improvement Program (CPIP). In the same year, Ehrlich renovated the "Woolworth Building" to an 8,000 square foot, two-story complex on the BLVD.

Later in 2012, Ehrlich's InSite Development, owns and constructed a museum of art history (MOAH) for the city.

Ehrlich has a hand in many other BLVD projects such as an underground bowling alley, coffee and yogurts kiosks, the micro-brewery, candy shop, clothing stores, gift shops, cupcake shop, a dog groomer as well as a motorcycle apparel and bike shop. Ehrlich has also been a catalyst for many other entrepreneurial developments in The BLVD area.

Film making
Ehrlich wrote an original musical for the stage,  "Pearly Gates: the Musical". He also directed, produced and starred in the musical. It was performed three times in Los Angeles in 2011. Later, Ehrlich has made his first independent feature film of the same name which is scheduled for release in early 2015. The film stars Scott Grimes, Uzo Aduba, Peter Bogdanovich, Bonnie Somerville, Lainie Kazan, Illeana Douglas, Sam McMurray, Larry Miller and Jack Noseworthy.

Other works
Ehrlich played Professional Tennis in Europe. He won Los Angeles City High School Tennis Championship in Senior Year of High School 1983. In 2014, he was the Coach of California Girls Soccer Team and won the State Cup Championship.

Awards and honors
In September 2010, the Lancaster City Council renamed a portion of Elm Ave, from Kettering Street to Milling Street that crosses Lancaster Blvd as "Ehrlich Avenue" to honor his influential downtown development.
 First Recipient of the Metamorphosis Award – Lancaster 2010
 Antelope Valley Board of Trade – Navigating Change Award 2012

References

External links
Company Website

Living people
1965 births
Real estate and property developers
People from Agoura Hills, California
People from Hollywood, Los Angeles
University of Arizona
American real estate businesspeople
American filmmakers